There are at least nine members of the buckthorn and grape order, Rhamnales, found in Montana.  Some of these species are exotics (not native to Montana) and some species have been designated as Species of Concern.

Buckthorns
Family: Rhamnaceae
Ceanothus herbaceus, New Jersey tea
Ceanothus sanguineus, redstem ceanothus
Ceanothus velutinus, snowbrush ceanothus
Frangula purshiana, Cascara false buckthorn
Rhamnus alnifolia, alderleaf buckthorn
Rhamnus cathartica, common buckthorn

Grapes
Family: Vitaceae
Parthenocissus quinquefolia, Virginia creeper
Parthenocissus vitacea, woodbine
Vitis riparia, riverbank grape

Further reading

See also
 List of dicotyledons of Montana

Notes

Montana
Montana